These are the results of the Weightlifting at the 2021 Islamic Solidarity Games which took place between 11 and 15 August 2022 in Konya, Turkey.

Men

55 kg
11 August

61 kg
12 August

67 kg
12 August

73 kg
13 August

81 kg
13 August

89 kg
14 August

96 kg
14 August

102 kg
15 August

109 kg
15 August

+109 kg
15 August

Women

45 kg
11 August

49 kg
11 August

55 kg
12 August

59 kg
12 August

64 kg
13 August

71 kg
14 August

76 kg
14 August

81 kg
14 August

87 kg
15 August

+87 kg
15 August

References

2021 Islamic Solidarity Games